Dato' Seri Paduka Maimunah binti Mohd Sharif (born 26 August 1961) is the Executive Director of the United Nations Human Settlements Programme (UN-Habitat). She assumed office in January 2018, becoming the first Asian woman to serve as Executive Director of UN-Habitat. On 20 January 2022, she was re-elected by the UN General Assembly for a two-year term that ends on 19 January 2024.

From January 2019 to January 2020 she also concurrently served as the Acting Director-General of the United Nations Office at Nairobi (UNON).
She holds the rank of Under-Secretary-General of the United Nations in the UN System and sits on the United Nations Chief Executives Board for Coordination and the Secretary-General's Senior Management Group.

Prior to her appointment as Executive Director of UN-Habitat, Sharif was the Mayor of Penang Island, Malaysia. Before her appointment as Mayor, she was the President of the Municipal Council of Seberang Perai from 2011, the first woman to be appointed to the position.

Family, early life and education 
Sharif was born and raised in Kuala Pilah, Negeri Sembilan, Malaysia, the daughter of Mohd Sharif bin Idu (father) and Shariah binti Adam (mother), together with four brothers and a sister. She undertook her primary school education at Sekolah Kebangsaan Sungai Dua, and her secondary school education at Tunku Kurshiah Kuala Pilah, Negeri Sembilan.

She attended the University of Wales Institute of Science and Technology and graduated with a Bachelor of Science with Honours in Town Planning Studies. She also holds a Master of Science in Planning Studies from the Malaysia Science University.

She is married to Adli Lai they have two daughters.

Career 

Sharif led a team which planned and implemented urban renewal projects in George Town, the capital of the Malaysian island of Penang. In November 2009, as its General Manager, Ms. Sharif established George Town World Heritage Incorporated and managed the George Town World Heritage Site, which was inscribed by UNESCO in July 2008. From 2017 to 2018, she served as the Mayor of the city council of Penang Island, Malaysia.

Following her nomination by the UN Secretary-General Antonio Guterres, the United Nations General Assembly elected Maimunah Sharif as the Executive Director of the United Nations Human Settlements Programme UN-Habitat on 22 December 2017. She was appointed by the UN Secretary General António Guterres for a four-year term.

With the UN

On 22 January 2018, Sharif assumed her post at UN-Habitat's Headquarters in Nairobi, Kenya. She succeeded Joan Clos of Spain. In January 2019 Maimunah Mohd Sharif was designated as the Acting Director-General of the United Nations Office at Nairobi following the appointment of her predecessor, Hanna Tetteh, as Head of the United Nations Office to the African Union in Addis Ababa. She was replaced by incumbent Zainab Bangura, who was appointed on 30 December 2019.

As  Executive Director of UN-Habitat Sharif has focused on reforming and rejuvenating the agency,  mobilizing for internal and external support for the organization's restructuring and new Strategic Plan 2020–2023. Her efforts seek to transform the organization into an agile and innovative leader on urban issues has been widely appreciated by stakeholders.

Initiatives undertaken by Sharif as Executive Director of UN-Habitat include the adoption of the General Assembly Resolution 73/539 which established a new governance structure for UN-Habitat and initiated an internal restrengthening process.

Sharif is overseeing the initiation of a blueprint for sustainable urban development, which brings together over 24 organizations for a system-wide United Nations strategy on sustainable urbanization.

In May 2019, Sharif headed the first UN-Habitat Assembly in Nairobi. Under the theme, ‘Innovation for Better Quality of Life in Cities and Communities’, with the sub-theme of  ‘Accelerated Implementation of the New Urban Agenda towards Achievement of the Sustainable Development Goals’, the Assembly brought together UN Member States, UN specialized agencies, local authorities and non-State actors, including civil society, youth and women, the private sector and academia. It established the Executive Board of UN-Habitat and elected its members, reviewed and approved the UN-Habitat Strategic Plan 2020–2023, and reviewed progress in the implementation of the New Urban Agenda (NUA), among other actions.

Sharif presided over the Ninth and Tenth sessions of the World Urban Forum; in Kuala Lumpur, Malaysia (2018) and Abu Dhabi, United Arab Emirates (2020), respectively. Convened by UN-Habitat, the World Urban Forum is the world's premier conference on cities. It was established in 2001 to discuss and examine rapid urbanization and its impact on communities, cities, economies, climate change and policy.

Sharif is known for her people-centred approach to urban planning and she has said  that "it is the people within cities that make them the vibrant places that they are. Young women and men flock to cities not for the infrastructure, but for the people and opportunities within that city." She places great importance on inclusivity in cities and works to promote the positions of marginalized individuals and communities, such as women and youth, whom she says are "traditionally left behind in governance, development and participatory processes.". She is also a firm believer in positive thinking, saying, "if we practice positive thinking, 50% of the hurdles are solved and remaining 50% to be worked for"

Honors and awards
Source:
  Officer of the Order of the Defender of the Realm (AMN) 
  Knight Commander of The Most Esteemed Order of Loyalty to Negeri Sembilan (DPNS) – Dato’ Paduka (2020)
  Commander of the Order of the Defender of the State (DGPN) – Dato’ Seri (2018)
  Officer of the Order of the Defender of the State (DSPN) – Dato’ (2014)
 Malaysian Institute of Planners  - Planner of The Year 2014.   
 Habitat III in Quito - 2016 Global Human Settlements Outstanding Contribution Award 
 Malaysia Book of Records, January 2018 - first Asian woman to be appointed as Executive Director of UN-Habitat.

Other activities 
Sharif is  a member of the International Gender Champions, a leadership network launched in 2015 that brings together female and male decision-makers determined to break down gender barriers and make gender equality a working reality in their spheres of influence. Sharif is committed to achieving gender parity at UN-Habitat. She has stated that "gender equality and women’s empowerment are issues very close to my heart. Women and girls are the ‘human face’ of cities and we must have equal opportunities for all and enjoy good quality of life". She is currently one of five Gender Champions based in Nairobi.

References

External links 
 UN-Habitat Profile

1961 births
Living people
Malaysian officials of the United Nations
21st-century Malaysian politicians
Under-Secretaries-General of the United Nations
United Nations Human Settlements Programme
Malaysian women
20th-century Malaysian women politicians
20th-century Malaysian politicians
United Nations officials
Mayors of places in Malaysia
Alumni of the University of Wales
21st-century Malaysian women politicians